This is the discography of the Haitian American record producer, musician and songwriter Jerry "Wonda" Duplessis. Releases by The Fugees are listed on their article page.

Albums

Studio albums

Compilation

EP

Singles

References

Discographies of American artists
Discographies of Haitian artists